The Dragon and Tiger Pagodas is a temple located at Lotus Lake in Zuoying District, Kaohsiung, Taiwan. The temple was built in 1976. One of the towers is the Tiger Tower, the other one being the Dragon tower.

Both towers are seven storeys tall and have yellow walls, red pillars and orange tiles. A zigzag bridge connects the towers to the shore. 

There are paintings inside the temple depicting Ksitigarbha. In the Tiger Tower, there are paintings of twelve Magi and the Jade Emperor's thirty palaces as well as paintings of Confucius. The towers have a double spiral staircase, one each for ascending and descending visitors.

Overlooking the towers are the Small Tortoise mountains, Spring and Autumn Pavilions, 5-mile Pavilion and Pei Chi Pavilion, as well as a surrounding lake.

See also
 Cide Temple
 Chi Ming Palace
 Zuoying Ciji Temple
 Zhouzi Qingshui Temple
 Spring and Autumn Pavilions
 List of temples in Taiwan
 List of tourist attractions in Taiwan

References 

1976 establishments in Taiwan
Pagodas in Taiwan
Palaces in Taiwan
Religious buildings and structures in Kaohsiung
Religious buildings and structures completed in 1976
Sculptures of dragons
Tigers in art
Zuoying District